During the 1998–99 English football season, Tranmere Rovers F.C. competed in the Football League First Division.

Season summary
In the 1998–99 season, Tranmere started the season poorly and were bottom of the league after failing to win their first 10 league games and by the middle of December, Tranmere were still near the relegation zone with only 4 league wins and the pressure on manager Aldridge increased but a good run of form into the new year with 6 wins from 10 league games eased all of the pressure and lifted them to 13th and saved Tranmere from any relegation worries and they finished a mixed season in 15th place.

Final league table

Results
Tranmere Rovers' score comes first

Legend

Football League First Division

FA Cup

League Cup

Squad

References

Tranmere Rovers F.C. seasons
Tranmere Rovers